Blink of an Eye is the fourth solo studio album by American singer-songwriter Michael McDonald, released on August 3, 1993 by Reprise Records, three years after his previous studio album, Take It to Heart (1990).

Track listing

Personnel

 Michael McDonald – lead vocals, backing vocals (1, 3-6, 10), keyboard programming, keyboards (1, 2, 3, 5-8, 11), synth horns (8), acoustic piano (8), acoustic piano solo (8), Wurlitzer electric piano (9), Fender Rhodes (10), synthesizers (10)
 Jeff Bova – keyboard programming, Hammond organ (1, 10), keyboards (2-5, 7, 8), synthesizers (2, 9), clavinet (9), drum programming (10)
 David Frank – synth horns (1, 8, 9), horn arrangements (1, 3, 9), synth bell (8)
 Benmont Tench – Hammond organ (5, 8, 9)
 Randy Kerber – keyboards (7), synth strings (10), synth horns (11)
 Greg Phillinganes – acoustic piano (10)
 Bernie Chiaravalle – guitars (1, 3)
 David Williams – guitars (1, 4)
 Mike Campbell – guitars (2)
 Randy Jacobs – guitars (3), rhythm guitar (9)
 Fred Tackett – acoustic guitar (5)
 Dean Parks – acoustic guitar (6)
 Robben Ford – guitars (7), rhythm guitar (9)
 Warren Haynes – lead guitar (9), guitar solo (9)
 Paul Jackson Jr. – guitars (10)
 Pino Palladino – bass (1, 3, 7, 8, 9, 11)
 Nathan East – bass (2)
 Marcus Miller – bass (4)
 Freddie Washington – bass (5, 10)
 Jimmy Bralower – drum programming (1-7, 9, 11)
 Manu Katché – additional drums (1), drums (4, 7-10)
 John Robinson – additional drums (3, 5), drums (9)
 George Perilli – additional drums (9)
 Lenny Castro – congas (3, 8), finger cymbals (6, 7), triangle (6, 7), tambourine (10)
 Brandon Fields – alto saxophone (1, 3, 4, 9)
 Albert Wing – tenor saxophone (1, 3, 9)
 Kirk Whalum – tenor saxophone (3, 7, 10)
 Bruce Fowler – trombone (1)
 Lee Thornburg – trumpet (1, 3, 9)
 Wallace Rooney – trumpet (11), trumpet solo (11)
 Chuck Findley – flugelhorn (11)
 Sweet Pea Atkinson – backing vocals (1, 10)
 Harry Bowen – backing vocals (1, 10)
 Clydene Edwards – backing vocals (1)
 Arnold McCuller – backing vocals (1, 10)
 Jenni Muldaur – backing vocals (1)
 Mona Lisa Young – backing vocals (1, 10)
 Amy Holland – backing vocals (4)
 Vince Gill – backing vocals (6)
 Alison Krauss – backing vocals (6)
 Chuck Sabatino – backing vocals (8, 10)

Production and artwork
 Produced by Michael McDonald and Russ Titelman.
 Basic track arrangements by Jeff Bova, Jimmy Bralower, Michael McDonald and Russ Titelman.
 Engineers – Bruce Barris, Ben Fowler and Mark Linnett.
 Assistant engineers – Chris Albert, Steve Elder, Chris Fogel, Mikael Ifverson, U.E. Nastasi and Charlie Paakkari.
 Mixed by Tom Lord-Alge, assisted by Tim Leitner.
 Recorded at The Power Station and East Hill Studios (New York City, NY); Capitol Studios and Westlake Audio (Los Angeles, CA).
 Mixed at Unique Recording Studios (New York City, NY).
 Mastered by Ted Jensen at Sterling Sound (New York City, NY).
 Original demo sequences technically assisted by Ross Pallone. 
 Production coordination – Joanne Schwartz
 Additional production coordination (Los Angeles) – Julie Larson
 Art direction and front cover photo – Bruce Steinberg
 Back cover bhoto – Gary Irving, Tony Stone Images
 Inside photo – Tony Stone Images

References

External links

1993 albums
Michael McDonald (musician) albums
Albums produced by Russ Titelman
Reprise Records albums